Raška may refer to:

Geography
 Raška (region), geographical and historical region in modern Serbia
 Raška (river), river in southwestern part of Serbia
 Raška, Serbia, town and municipality in Serbia

History and administration
 Eparchy of Raška, a medieval diocese (eparchy) of the Serbian Orthodox Church
 Catepanate of Raška, variant designation for the Catepanate of Ras, a short lived Byzantine province (971-976) in central Serbian lands
 Grand Principality of Raška, variant designation for the Grand Principality of Serbia, in the 11th and 12th century
 Kingdom of Raška, variant designation for the medieval Kingdom of Serbia, in the 13th and 14th century
 Raška architectural style, architectural style in medieval Serbia, in the 12th and 13th century
 Despotate of Raška, variant designation for the Despotate of Serbia, in the 15th century
 Little Raška, a region inhabited by Serbs (Rascians) in southern regions of Pannonian plain, from the 16th to 18th century
 Raška Oblast, former administrative district in Kingdom of Serbs, Croats and Slovenes from 1922 to 1929 
 Raška District, modern administrative district (ser. "okrug") in Serbia

People with the surname
 Adam Raška (born 1994), Czech professional ice hockey player. He currently plays with HC Kometa Brno in the Czech Extraliga
 Jiří Raška (1941–2012), Czech ski jumper, gold medalist in the 1968 Winter Olympics
 Karel Raška (1909–1987), Czech physician and epidemiologist
 Martin Raška (born 1977), Czech football goalkeeper
 Chris Raschka (born 1959), Austrian-American illustrator, writer and violist

See also 
 Raska (disambiguation)
 Rassa (disambiguation)